is a Japanese politician of the Liberal Democratic Party (LDP), a member of the House of Representatives in the Diet (national legislature).

Early life and education
A native of Takasaki, Gunma, Shimomura was born on 23 May 1954. He lost his father at the age of nine and endured severe financial hardship in order to complete his education, but obtained scholarships to complete high school and university. He operated a cram school while enrolled as a student at Waseda University.

Career
Shimomura had served in the assembly of Tokyo for two terms since 1989. He was elected to the House of Representatives for the first time in 1996. He is a representative of the district of Tokyo No. 11 in the lower house. He was deputy chief cabinet secretary in the first government of Shinzo Abe in 2006.

Shimomura was again appointed to the Cabinet by Shinzo Abe as minister of education, culture, sports, science and technology on 26 December 2012. As minister, Shimomura expanded the ability of local schools to provide Saturday classes and pushed for the globalization of Japanese universities by increasing English skills and hiring more foreign faculty.

He oversaw preparations by the Organising Committee for the 2020 Summer Olympics on behalf of the national government in Tokyo before being replaced by Olympics Minister Toshiaki Endo on 25 June 2015.

Following the resignation of Tokyo governor Naoki Inose on 19 December 2013, Shimomura was widely rumored to be a potential candidate for the gubernatorial election expected to be held in February 2014, along with Yuriko Koike, Hideo Higashikokubaru, Seiko Hashimoto and Yoichi Masuzoe. The LDP excluded his name from consideration in a 20 December poll so that he could focus his efforts on the Tokyo Olympics.

Political views
Shimomura is affiliated to the openly revisionist organization Nippon Kaigi, and his political views are fully consistent with the organization's agenda.

Prior to the 2012 general election, Shimomura told the magazine Apple Town that "we intend to construct a genuinely conservative administration... [such that] has only existed for about three years since the war", describing tensions with China and South Korea as a "national crisis" and stating that "the 67 years since the end of World War II have been a history of Japan’s destruction."

In regards to comfort women, he commented in 2007 that "it is true that there were comfort women. I believe some parents may have sold their daughters. But it does not mean the Japanese army was involved." Following his appointment as education minister in 2012, he refused to comment on the issue but stated that "the government has decided to study Japan's interpretation of history, including the Kono Statement [acknowledging the army's involvement], and I would like to express my views during that process, if necessary."

Shimomura refused to intercede in a debate over the censorship of the manga Barefoot Gen, which depicts the atomic bombing of Hiroshima and Japan's culpability in World War II, by a school board in Matsue, stating that young students may not be able to understand its depictions properly.

Shimomura supported the restarting of nuclear power reactors in Japan following the Fukushima nuclear disaster, stating that "if Japan finds itself losing its power supply, companies would quickly relocate their operations abroad and deindustrialization would rapidly spread – and Japan wouldn't be able to revitalize its economy."

Shimomura has a son with a learning disability who graduated from the University of the Arts London in 2013. Shimomura commented to the New York Times that his son would not have been able to enroll in a Japanese university, and said "the British system is more open to a broader range of people and talents... I would like to see the system here be revamped so that avenues of opportunities will be open to all children. After all, considering where we want to go, it is less important for us to create 10,000 people with run-of-the mill capabilities than a few with superb talents."

In April 2018, Shimomura called it "almost a crime" for the TV reporter who complained of sexually harassment (explicit language) to have secretly taped the former Ministry of Finance top official  who was her alleged victimizer and "selling" the story to a tabloid weekly. The originally anonymous reporter was revealed to be affiliated with TV Asahi by the time Shimomura made the statement. Although he retracted his choice of words the next day, he still insisted he had a point to make in that the reporter violated the journalistic principle of speaking off-the-record, and he spoke out because he suspected her of staging this with the intention of selling the story to the tabloids from the beginning.

References

External links

1954 births
Living people
Members of the House of Representatives from Tokyo
Members of the Tokyo Metropolitan Assembly
Liberal Democratic Party (Japan) politicians
People from Takasaki, Gunma
Members of Nippon Kaigi
Presidents of the Organising Committees for the Olympic Games
Government ministers of Japan
21st-century Japanese politicians
Education ministers of Japan
Historical negationism
Culture ministers of Japan
Science ministers of Japan
Sports ministers of Japan
Technology ministers of Japan